Daniel F. Javier was a Filipino teacher, born in Consolacion, Sogod, Southern Leyte.

He was teacher and principal of Cebu Normal School of Cebu City in the early 20th-century. In 1914 he explored the surrounding area of the new settlement in the barrio Bugho of Abuyog, Leyte. At that time he had come from Cabadbaran, Agusan del Norte, where he had farmed since 1908 after his resignation as principal at the Cebu Normal School.

He died in Consolacion in 1957. Two years after his death, Bugho was finally converted to an independent municipality. In December 1965, the municipal Council of (then) Bugho unanimously approved a resolution to change its name to Javier, in honor of him.

Notes

External links
Javieranon Global Network

References

 

1957 deaths
Filipino philanthropists
People from Southern Leyte
Year of birth missing
Filipino schoolteachers
20th-century Filipino educators
20th-century philanthropists